The 2022 World Men's Curling Championship (branded as the 2022 LGT World Men's Curling Championship for sponsorship reasons) was held from April 2 to April 10 at Orleans Arena in Las Vegas, United States. Team Sweden, skipped by Niklas Edin, was the defending championship team. The 2022 WMCC trialed the no-tick rule for the first time at a men's tournament at this level.

In the final, Team Edin won its fourth straight world title, defeating Canada's Brad Gushue rink 8–6. It was the sixth career World title for Edin, whose team became the first ever to win an Olympic gold and World championship in the same year. In the game, Canada got off to a strong start, leading 3–0 after two. However, Sweden came back, tying it up at three in the fourth end, when Sweden scored a deuce after Gushue's last stone hit a ridge in the ice, and moved the wrong way. Canada was forced to a single in the fifth, and Sweden scored two in the sixth after Gushue missed a double takeout attempt. In the seventh, Gushue was forced to a single despite a crowded house, tying the game at five. In the ninth, with Canada down by one, Gushue missed a blank opportunity, by nosing a Swedish rock, and forcing the team to take one point, tying the game heading into the last end, without hammer.  In the last end, with the score tied at six, Canada got off to a bad start with lead Geoff Walker hogged one of his rocks. On his final shot, Gushue missed his last draw against two Swedish stones, giving Sweden the championship. After the game, Gushue complained about the ice conditions, stating "(it was) the worst ice I've ever curled on in a major championship", due in part to there being four "ridges" on the ice. Edin agreed, stating that "(the) game was very tough, difficult conditions to play on."

Italy's team, skipped by Joël Retornaz, won the bronze medal game after defeating the host Americans 13–4.

Qualification
The World Curling Federation changed the qualification process for the World Curling Championships beginning in 2022 in key ways, as a transition year to a new qualification format for 2023. As before, the selection process started with the presumption that Europe receives eight entries, with two entries each from the American and Pacific-Asia Zones, but with a reduction of entries from one of the three zones – the zone with the lowest ranked competitor in the previous World Curling Championship.  Two additional entries were then determined by the 2022 World Qualification Event, bringing the total to thirteen entries for the championship. The host nation for the championship continues to receive a guaranteed entry as one of the entries in its zone. The Americas Challenge was required as a means of entry for at least one team from the Americas in 2022. No entry was determined by tour-based rankings. Beginning in 2023, this system will be replaced, with all entries determined by two world zones championships. Seven guaranteed entries will come from the European Championship and five guaranteed entries from a Pan Continental Championship, the latter of which will include the America zone and the Pacific-Asia zone. The thirteenth entry will be determined by assessing the aggregate performance of the top five teams in each zone, with an extra entry from the better performing zone.

As a result of these changes, Canada participated in the Americas Challenge in order to qualify for the 2022 World Men's Curling Championship, represented by Team Bottcher, which won the event and qualified Canada as an entry. Though fourteen teams competed at the 2021 World Men's Curling Championship, South Korea and China were ranked thirteenth and fourteenth, removing one automatic entry for the Pacific-Asia zone for the 2022 Championships. The remaining entries were determined by the playoffs at the 2022 World Qualification Event.

Russian Participation
As part of international sports' reaction to the Russian invasion of Ukraine, on February 28 the World Curling Federation initiated proceedings to remove the Russian Curling Federation from the upcoming Curling Championship. In its statement the WCF said:

On March 4, the World Curling Federation announced the removal of the Russian Curling Federation from the 2022 World Championships.  On March 12, they announced that Finland, who placed third in the Qualifying event, would replace the RCF.

Teams
The teams are as follows:

Rule changes
The main rule change between the 2021 and 2022 WMCC is the introduction of the no-tick rule. This will prohibit ticking a stone off of the centre line until after the fifth stone of the end has been thrown. If a stone is ticked off of the centre line before then, it is restored to its position, similar to if a stone is removed from play from the free guard zone.

Round-robin standings
Final round-robin standings

Round-robin results

All draw times are listed in Pacific Time (UTC−07:00).

Draw 1
Saturday, April 2, 2:00 pm

Draw 2
Saturday, April 2, 7:00 pm

Draw 3
Sunday, April 3, 9:00 am

Draw 4
Sunday, April 3, 2:00 pm

Draw 5
Sunday, April 3, 7:00 pm

Draw 6
Monday, April 4, 9:00 am

Draw 7
Monday, April 4, 2:00 pm

Draw 8
Monday, April 4, 7:00 pm

Draw 9
Tuesday, April 5, 9:00 am

Draw 10
Tuesday, April 5, 2:00 pm

Draw 11
Tuesday, April 5, 7:00 pm

Draw 12
Wednesday, April 6, 9:00 am

Draw 13
Wednesday, April 6, 2:00 pm

Draw 14
Wednesday, April 6, 7:00 pm

Draw 15
Thursday, April 7, 9:00 am

^ ran out of time, and therefore forfeited the match.

Draw 16
Thursday, April 7, 2:00 pm

Draw 17
Thursday, April 7, 7:00 pm

Draw 18
Friday, April 8, 9:00 am

Draw 19
Friday, April 8, 2:00 pm

Draw 20
Friday, April 8, 7:00 pm

Playoffs

Qualification games
Saturday, April 9, 2:00 pm

Semifinals
Saturday, April 9, 7:00 pm

Bronze-medal game
Sunday, April 10, 11:00 am

Final
Sunday, April 10, 4:00 pm

Statistics

Top 5 player percentages
Final round robin percentages

Perfect games
Minimum 10 shots thrown

Final standings

Awards
The awards were as follows:

Collie Campbell Memorial Award
 Simone Gonin, Italy

References

External links

World Men's Curling Championship
World Men's Curling Championship
World Men's Curling Championship
Curling in Nevada
Sports competitions in Las Vegas